Acanthoscurria gomesiana is a species of tarantula first identified in Brazil in 1923. It is known for producing the gomesin peptides, a class of proteins which have found to have anti-tumour and anti-microbial properties.

References

Theraphosidae
Spiders described in 1923